Gum metal, also called TNTZ, is a unique titanium alloy with high elasticity, ductility, and yield strength. While originally developed with a composition of 23% niobium, 0.7% tantalum, 2% zirconium, and 1% oxygen, it can exist over a range of compositions and also include vanadium and hafnium.

At the same time, cold work increases gum metal's yield strength.

"Gum metal" is a registered trademark of Toyota Central R&D Labs and was initially developed there. The results of that research were first published in April 2003.

References 

Titanium alloys